Onthatile Owethu Zulu (born 14 March 2000) is a field hockey player from South Africa. In 2020, she was an athlete at the Summer Olympics.

Personal life
Onthatile Zulu was born and raised in Gauteng.

Career

National team
Zulu made her senior international debut for South Africa in 2019, during a qualifying event for the 2020 Summer Olympics in Stellenbosch.

Following a string of good performances in the lead up to selection, Zulu was named in the squad for the 2020 Summer Olympics in Tokyo. She will make her Olympic debut on 24 July 2021, in the Pool A match against Ireland.

Christa Ramasimong and her are the co-captains of the South Africa U21 team to compete in the FIH Women's Junior World Cup.

Honours

Club
University of Pretoria
Varsity Hockey 2019: FNB Player of the Tournament Award

References

External links

2000 births
Living people
Female field hockey midfielders
South African female field hockey players
Sportspeople from Gauteng
Field hockey players at the 2020 Summer Olympics
Olympic field hockey players of South Africa
TuksHockey Club players
21st-century South African women
Field hockey players at the 2022 Commonwealth Games